Nedim Tutić  (born 17 July 1968) is a Bosnian professional football manager and former player and current manager of Othellos Athienou.

Club career
Tutić played for Liria Prizren and FK Sloboda Užice in the Yugoslav Second League, and with FK Sarajevo and FK Rad in the Yugoslav First League. He had a brief spell with Zeytinburnuspor in the Turkish Super Lig.

Managerial statistics

References

External sources

1968 births
Living people
Yugoslav footballers
Bosnia and Herzegovina footballers
Association football midfielders
FK Sarajevo players
KF Liria players
FK Sloboda Užice players
FK Rad players
AC Omonia players
Zeytinburnuspor footballers
Olympiakos Nicosia players
Ethnikos Assia FC players
Yugoslav First League players
Yugoslav Second League players
Cypriot First Division players
Süper Lig players
Bosnia and Herzegovina expatriate footballers
Expatriate footballers in Cyprus
Bosnia and Herzegovina expatriate sportspeople in Cyprus
Expatriate footballers in Turkey
Bosnia and Herzegovina expatriate sportspeople in Turkey
Bosnia and Herzegovina football managers
AC Omonia managers
Nea Salamis Famagusta FC managers
Bosnia and Herzegovina expatriate football managers
Expatriate football managers in Cyprus